George Stuart Henderson VC,  DSO & Bar, MC (5 December 1893 – 24 July 1920) was a British Army officer and a Scottish recipient of the Victoria Cross, the highest award for gallantry in the face of the enemy that can be awarded to British and Commonwealth forces.

Early life
Henderson was born in East Gordon, Berwickshire, on 5 December 1893 to Robert and Mary Henderson.

Details
Henderson was 26 years old, and a captain in the 2nd Battalion, The Manchester Regiment during the 1920 Iraqi Revolt, then called Mesopotamia, when the following deed took place on 24 July 1920 near Hillah, Mesopotamia for which he was awarded the VC.

He is commemorated on Jedburgh War Memorial and the Basra Memorial.

The medal
His Victoria Cross is displayed at the Museum of the Manchester Regiment in Ashton-under-Lyne, England.

References

Further reading

External links

 Museum of the Manchester Regiment
 The Duke of Lancaster's Regiment
 

1893 births
1920 deaths
British recipients of the Victoria Cross
Manchester Regiment officers
People educated at Rossall School
British military personnel killed in action
Recipients of the Military Cross
People from the Scottish Borders
British Army personnel of World War I
Companions of the Distinguished Service Order
British military personnel of the Iraqi revolt of 1920
British Army recipients of the Victoria Cross